Erik Axel Dahlin (born 28 April 1989) is a Swedish former footballer who played as a goalkeeper. He is a younger brother of the Malmö FF goalkeeper Johan Dahlin.

References

External links

1989 births
Living people
Swedish footballers
Sweden youth international footballers
Swedish expatriate footballers
Expatriate footballers in Norway
Swedish expatriate sportspeople in Norway
Allsvenskan players
Eliteserien players
IFK Göteborg players
FC Trollhättan players
Västra Frölunda IF players
Sogndal Fotball players
Ljungskile SK players
Association football goalkeepers
People from Trollhättan
Sportspeople from Västra Götaland County